The Vilyuy (Bülüü) is a river in Russia, the longest tributary of the Lena.

History
The river is first mentioned in the 17th century in connection with the Russian conquest of Siberia.
In 1634, Russian Cossacks, headed by Voin Shakhov, established a winter settlement at the  confluence of the rivers Vilyuy and Tyukyan. This settlement served as the administrative center of the area for several decades, after which it was moved to the Yolyonnyokh area  down by the Vilyuy, where the ostrog (fortified settlement) of Olensk (now Vilyuysk) was founded in 1773.

This led to the construction of the Mir Mine, together with access roads and an airport, and the Vilyuy Dam complex to generate power needed for the diamond concentrators.

Geography and geology

The Vilyuy has its sources in the Vilyuy Plateau, part of the Central Siberian Plateau, in the Evenkiysky District (Krasnoyarsk Krai) and, flowing east, soon enters Sakha. The Ust-Vilyuy Range rises above the facing bank of the Lena, opposite the mouth of the Vilyuy.

To the west of the Vilyuy and Chona is the Nizhnyaya Tunguska basin.
The Vilyuy basin is sparsely populated. Small settlements along the river include Vilyuysk, Verkhnevilyuysk, Suntar, and Nyurba.

The main tributaries of the Vilyuy are the Ulakhan-Vava, Chirkuo, Chona, Chybyda, Ulakhan-Botuobuya, Ochchuguy-Botuobuya, Tangnary, and Bappagay on the right; and the Akhtaranda, Ygyatta, Markha, Tyukyan, and Tyung on the left.

Vilyuy is associated with geological formations Yakutsk-Vilyuy Rift (Vilyuy Rift Basin) and Yakutsk-Vilyuy LIP (large igneous province), also known as Vilyuy Traps.

See also
List of rivers of Russia
Tukulan, sand dunes

References

External links

Encyclopædia Britannica

Rivers of Krasnoyarsk Krai
Rivers of the Sakha Republic
Tributaries of the Lena
Central Yakutian Lowland